Ernest Pinkney (23 November 1887 – 1975) was an English professional association football player either side of the First World War.

Pinkney was born in Glasgow to English parents from Yorkshire. The family moved back to England when he was still young.

He played for West Hartlepool, before joining Everton, where he made 8 appearances in The Football League. He subsequently played for Barrow of the Lancashire Combination and New Brompton of the Southern League, where he played regularly for two seasons before competitive football was abandoned due to the outbreak of war.

After the war, he returned to Lancashire to play for Liverpool and Tranmere Rovers before joining Halifax Town. He finished his Football League career with Accrington Stanley.

References

1887 births
1975 deaths
English Football League players
Gillingham F.C. players
Liverpool F.C. players
Everton F.C. players
Tranmere Rovers F.C. players
Halifax Town A.F.C. players
Accrington Stanley F.C. (1891) players
English footballers
Date of death missing
Barrow A.F.C. players
Footballers from Glasgow
Association football wingers
Anglo-Scots
Footballers from Hartlepool